Crassispira abundans is an extinct species of sea snail, a marine gastropod mollusk in the family Pseudomelatomidae, the turrids and allies.

Description

Distribution
Fossils have been found in Oligocene strata in Mississippi, USA: age range: 33.9 to 28.4 Ma

References

 J. A. Gardner. 1948. Mollusca from the Miocene and Lower Pliocene of Virginia and North Carolina: Part 2. Scaphopoda and Gastropoda. United States Geological Survey Professional Paper 199(B):179-310

External links
 Fossilworks : Crassispira abundans

abundans
Gastropods described in 1840